Jordan Richards may refer to:
Jordan Richards (American football) (born 1993), defensive back for the New England Patriots
Jordan Richards (footballer, born 1993), English football defender
Jordan Richards (footballer, born 1997), English football midfielder 
Jordan Richards (volleyball) (born 1993), Australian volleyball player